Anacampseros papyracea is a species of succulent plant in the genus Anacampseros. It is endemic to Southern Africa.

Distribution 

 Anacampseros papyracea subsp. papyracea is endemic to the Eastern Cape. 
 Anacampseros papyracea subsp. namaensis is endemic to Namibia, and also found in the Northern Cape. 
 Anacampseros papyracea subsp. perplexa is found in the Western Cape

Taxonomy 
Anacampseros papyracea contains the following subspecies:

Conservation status 
Both Anacampseros papyracea subsp. papyracea and Anacampseros papyracea subsp. namaensis is classified as Least Concern.

References

External links 
 
 

Endemic flora of South Africa
Flora of South Africa
Flora of Southern Africa
Flora of the Cape Provinces
Plants described in 1840
Taxa named by Ernst Heinrich Friedrich Meyer
papyracea